Little Bollington is a village and civil parish in Cheshire, England. The Bridgewater Canal runs through the western side and Dunham Park lies to the north east.

At the 2011 census the population was 170. In place of a parish council, administration takes place via a parish meeting.

History
At Fairy Brow in Little Bollington, there is evidence of Bronze Age activity. An archaeological dig by South Trafford Archaeological Group in 1983 uncovered an oval Bronze Age burial pit. In the burial were (unurned) cremated remains of an adult male; the remains were radio carbon dated to 3435 (+/-35) bp. A tanged copper alloy knife dated 2000-1500 BC was with the cremated remains. According to the Domesday survey in 1086, the manor of Little Bollington was held by the Saxon thegn Aelfward and later by the Norman Hamon de Mascy. The northern part of Little Bollington was in the medieval parish of Bowdon.

Demography
At the 2001 census, Little Bollington had a total population of 162. For every 100 females, there were 100 males. The average household size was 2.22. Of those aged 16–74 in Little Bollington, 48.0% had no academic qualifications or one GCSE, similar to the figures for all of the former Borough of Macclesfield (35.6%) and England (45.5%). According to the census, 0% were unemployed and 24.41% were economically inactive. 9.88% of the population were under the age of 16 and 11.73% were aged 75 and over; the mean age of the people of Little Bollington was 47.83. 64.81% of residents described their health as 'good'.

See also

Listed buildings in Little Bollington

References

Bibliography

External links
 Little Bollington Parish Meeting website

Villages in Cheshire
Civil parishes in Cheshire